John Fownes Luttrell (1752 – 16 February 1816) was an English Tory politician from Dunster Castle in Somerset. Like many previous generations of Luttrells since the 16th century, he was a Member of Parliament (MP) for Minehead, his family's pocket borough near Dunster. He sat in the House of Commons of Great Britain and then in the House of Commons of the United Kingdom from 1774 until his death in 1816, except for a few months in 1806–07.

Early life and family 
Fownes Luttrell was the oldest son of Henry Fownes Luttrell I (formerly Henry Fownes, –1780).
His mother Margaret was the daughter of Alexander Luttrell (1705–1737),
who had bequeathed his estates to Margaret on condition that her husband take the surname Luttrell.

On 2 August 1782 Fownes Luttrell married Mary Drewe, daughter of Francis Drewe of The Grange, Devon. They had 5 sons and four daughters, including:
 John Fownes Luttrell (1787–1857), MP for Minehead
Henry Fownes Luttrell (1790–1867), MP for Minehead
 Francis, an army captain
 Alexander, a Church of England minister (died 1888 aged 95)who became rector of East Quantoxhead
 Thomas, a Church of England minister (died 1871 aged 77), curate of Dunster
 Mary-Anne Fownes Luttrell (1783-1835)
 Margaret Fownes Luttrell (1784-1858)
 Charlotte Fownes Luttrell (1786-1791)
 Harriet Fownes Luttrell (1788-1870)

Career 
At the 1774 general election, Fownes Luttrell was elected as one of the two Members of Parliament (MPs) for Minehead, his family's pocket borough. The borough's second seat was held by his father, who had secured Lord North's support for unopposed Luttrell patronage of the borough with an expectation that one candidate would be a North nominee.
Henry Fownes Luttrell therefore promptly vacated his seat in favour of North's candidate, former Governor Thomas Pownall.

Henry Fownes Luttrell continued the pattern of reserving one seat for his son and selling the other to government supporter until his death in 1780.
John then succeeded his father and continued the practice of returning himself and a purchaser, until a vacancy arose in 1795 when Viscount Parker succeeded to the peerage. John then nominated his younger brother Thomas, an army officer, who was returned unopposed.
However, John's "overbearing" conduct led to a contest at the 1796 general election, when Thomas was defeated by the London banker John Langston, who had purchased land in the borough. Fownes Luttrell's allies in Minehead then planned the eviction of tenants who had failed to support the family, but Langston persisted and contested the seat again in 1802, but was defeated. An election petition was prepared, but after prolonged negotiations a deal was reached whereby the petition was dropped and Fownes Luttrell purchased all of Langston's property in the borough.

Fownes Luttrell intended to return himself again in 1806, but after his treating voters extended into the period when that was forbidden, he withdrew in favour of his friend Sir John Lethbridge. At the general election in May 1807 there was a challenge from Thomas Bowes, brother of the Earl of Strathmore. However Bowes withdrew part way through polling, There were no further contests in the borough until it was disenfranchised under the Reform Act 1832.

At the next election, in 1812, Fownes Luttrell returned himself and his oldest son and heir John Fownes Luttrell II. They sat together until the father's death in 1816, when his seat was taken by the second son, Henry.

See also 
 Feudal barony of Dunster

References

External links 
  (from 1807)

1752 births
1816 deaths
John Fownes
People educated at Eton College
Alumni of The Queen's College, Oxford
Tory MPs (pre-1834)
Members of the Parliament of Great Britain for English constituencies
British MPs 1774–1780
British MPs 1780–1784
British MPs 1784–1790
British MPs 1790–1796
British MPs 1796–1800
Members of the Parliament of the United Kingdom for English constituencies
UK MPs 1801–1802
UK MPs 1802–1806
UK MPs 1806–1807
UK MPs 1807–1812
UK MPs 1812–1818